Summer Rain is a 1937 Italian comedy film directed by Mario Monicelli. It was his first full-length feature film.

Cast
 Raniero Barsanti
 Franca Taylor
 Ermete Zacconi
 Ernes Zacconi

References

External links

1937 films
Italian comedy films
1930s Italian-language films
1937 comedy films
Italian black-and-white films
Films directed by Mario Monicelli
1930s rediscovered films
Rediscovered Italian films
1930s Italian films